Samuel A. Buckmaster (1817-1878) was an American politician who served as the Speaker of the Illinois House of Representatives during the 23rd General Assembly.

Biographical Sketch
Buckmaster was born in Virginia in 1817. He was first elected to the Illinois House of Representatives in 1851 and served two terms. He was the mayor of Alton, Illinois from 1853 to 1854. He was a member of the Illinois Senate from 1859 to 1862. He returned to the House in 1863 during which he was selected as speaker and presided over a politically fraught session in the height of the American Civil War. He served a single term later in the 1870s. He ran unsuccessfully for the Illinois Senate in the 1878 general election. He died November 13, 1878.

References

Speakers of the Illinois House of Representatives
Democratic Party members of the Illinois House of Representatives
Democratic Party Illinois state senators
People of Illinois in the American Civil War
19th-century American politicians
People from Alton, Illinois
1817 births
1878 deaths
Mayors of places in Illinois